Arnold L. "Arnie" Roblan (born April 8, 1948) is an American former educator and a Democratic politician who served as a member of the Oregon House of Representatives from the 9th district, which spans the southern Oregon Coast. He also served as co-speaker of the House for the 2011–2012 session along with Republican Bruce Hanna. He served as a member of the Oregon State Senate from 2013 to 2021

Early life and education 
Roblan was born in Port Angeles, Washington. He attended the University of Washington and the University of Oregon.

Career
Roblan is a former high school principal and math teacher. Roblan was first elected to the Oregon House of Representatives in 2004. In the 2009–2010 session, Roblan served as speaker pro tem. Roblan chaired the Agriculture and Natural Resources Committee and the Rural Policy Committee. He was a member of the Education Committee.

In 2016, Roblan defeated then Lincoln City Councilman Dick Anderson, a Republican, by 30,388 votes to 30,039, 48.2% to 47.7%.

Roblan did not seek re-election in 2020. Anderson ran again and defeated former Coos County Commissioner Melissa Cribbins, a Democrat, 49.4% to 46.5%.

Personal life 
He has lived in Coos Bay since the early-1970s with his wife Arlene. They have three children.

External links
 Campaign website
 Legislative website

References 

Speakers of the Oregon House of Representatives
Democratic Party members of the Oregon House of Representatives
People from Coos Bay, Oregon
Educators from Oregon
University of Oregon alumni
Living people
1948 births
21st-century American politicians